Martin Jenáček (born July 14, 1975) is a Czech professional ice hockey player. He played with HC Litvínov in the Czech Extraliga during the 2010–11 Czech Extraliga season.

References

External links

1975 births
Czech ice hockey right wingers
HC Litvínov players
Living people
Sportspeople from Zlín
Hokej Šumperk 2003 players
VHK Vsetín players
EHC Freiburg players
PSG Berani Zlín players
Czech expatriate ice hockey players in Germany